Sol Mamakwa (Oji-Cree: ᓴᐧᓬ ᒣᒣᑫᐧ)   is a Canadian politician who was elected to the Legislative Assembly of Ontario in the 2018 provincial election. He represents the riding of Kiiwetinoong as a member of the Ontario New Democratic Party (ONDP). Mamakwa is currently the Vice-Chair of the Standing Committee on Justice Policy. Mamakwa is a member of the Kingfisher Lake First Nation and speaks Oji-Cree as a first language.

Prior to his election to the legislature, he worked for the Nishnawbe Aski Nation in Sioux Lookout. Mamakwa was one of three MPPs of Indigenous heritage elected in 2018, alongside ONDP colleagues Suze Morrison and Guy Bourgouin, and the second person of full First Nations descent elected to the assembly after Peter North in 1990.

Electoral record

References

Living people
21st-century Canadian politicians
21st-century First Nations people
First Nations politicians
Oji-Cree people
Ontario New Democratic Party MPPs
People from Sioux Lookout
Year of birth missing (living people)